The Women's vault competition at the 2022 Mediterranean Games was held on 29 June 2022 at the Olympic Complex Sports Hall.



Qualification

Final

References

Women's vault
2022
2022 in women's gymnastics